NOFX is an American punk rock band formed in Los Angeles, California in 1983. Vocalist/bassist Fat Mike, guitarist Eric Melvin and drummer Erik Sandin are original founding and longest-serving members of the band, who have appeared on every release of the band, although Sandin departed briefly in 1985, only to rejoin the following year. El Hefe joined the band in 1991 to play lead guitar and trumpet, rounding out the current line-up.

NOFX's mainstream success coincided with increased interest in punk rock during the 1990s, though, unlike many of their contemporaries they have never been signed to a major label. NOFX has released fifteen studio albums, sixteen extended plays and a number of 7-inch singles. The band rose to popularity with their fifth studio album Punk in Drublic (1994), which is their only release to receive gold certification by the RIAA. Their latest studio album, Double Album, was released on December 2, 2022. The group has sold over eight million records worldwide, making them one of the most successful independent bands. In 2008, NOFX broadcast their own show on Fuse TV entitled NOFX: Backstage Passport.

History

Early years (1983–1987)
In 1983, guitarist Eric Melvin met bassist/vocalist Mike Burkett (Fat Mike) and started the band under the name NO-FX, after a Boston hardcore punk band called Negative FX. At this time, they were joined by drummer Erik "Smelly" Sandin. NOFX's first recording was a demo  from 1984, entitled Thalidomide Child, produced by Germs drummer Don Bolles, which did not sell many copies, and Fat Mike once claimed that no copies existed. The demo would be re-released in 2012. The group released its self-titled debut extended play NOFX on Mystic Records in 1985; it was later re-released in 1992 as part of the Maximum Rocknroll CD.

The band's early line-up underwent numerous changes, however, the current lineup has been together since 1991. For a year, Erik "Smelly" Sandin left the band and was replaced by Scott Sellers, and later by Scott Aldahl. Dave Allen was in the band for about four months, until he died in a car accident. In 1986, the band released the extended play So What If We're on Mystic!. Dave Casillas joined the band on second guitar in 1987 and was featured on the extended play The P.M.R.C. Can Suck on This, attacking the PMRC's campaign for music censorship. The original cover was an edited S&M photo; the cover for the re-released version was changed to a photo of Eric Melvin. Prior to the release of Liberal Animation, a compilation of 14 early NOFX songs was released on Mystic Records. The album was self-titled, and featured the songs from the NOFX and So What If We're on Mystic! extended plays, and only around 1,000 copies were pressed. The album's cover was a redesigned version of the cover from the NOFX extended play.

First four albums and signing to Epitaph (1988–1993)
NOFX recorded their debut studio album Liberal Animation in 1988 with Brett Gurewitz of Bad Religion. Although the title and some of the album's lyrics mocked vegetarianism and animal rights, Fat Mike says that he became a vegetarian after writing the Liberal Animation album. The album was re-released in 1991 on Gurewitz's label Epitaph Records. Casillas left the band shortly after the recording of Liberal Animation and was replaced by Steve Kidwiler. The band released its second studio album, S&M Airlines, through Epitaph in 1989.

In 1991, NOFX released its third studio album, Ribbed. Shortly after the album was released, Steve Kidwiler left the band, and Aaron Abeyta (a.k.a. "El Hefe") joined the group. With Abeyta, the band recorded the extended play The Longest Line, followed by the studio album White Trash, Two Heebs and a Bean, released in May and November 1992 respectively. Also in 1992, NOFX's former label Mystic Records released Maximum Rocknroll, which compiles early singles and demo songs and is a reissue of their 1989 long-out-of-print compilation tape E Is for Everything. Despite being referred to as an "official" release, Fat Mike has been quoted as saying that he did not know that the album existed until he saw a copy of it "in a store."

Rise to popularity (1994–1999)

In the wake of the 1990s punk rock revival revolution (dominated by Green Day, The Offspring, Bad Religion and Rancid), NOFX released their fifth studio album Punk in Drublic in July 1994. It is one of the band's most successful albums, peaking at number 12 on Billboards Heatseekers chart, and obtaining gold status six years after its release. Although one of the album's singles "Leave It Alone" got airplay on active rock radio stations, the most notable being KROQ, its music video never received airplay on MTV. Fat Mike has been quoted saying, "We made the 'Leave It Alone' video, and we decided not to send it to MTV. We just didn't want to be a part of that machine, of that 'punk wave.'"

Due to the success of Punk in Drublic, NOFX received many offers to sign with major record labels, but the band declined the offers. In 1995, the band released its first live album, I Heard They Suck Live!!. In the liner notes the band explicitly rejected the advances of major record labels and radio airplay, stating "We've been doing fine all these years without you so leave us alone!" Punk in Drublic is now considered a classic punk album by fans and critics alike.

Punk in Drublic was followed by 1996's Heavy Petting Zoo, whose LP companion featured different cover art and the name Eating Lamb. The artwork for the CD featured a man holding a sheep, while the LP depicted the same man in a 69 position with the sheep. The Eating Lamb version was banned from sale in Germany due to its obscene cover art. The LP version did not achieve the success of its predecessor, although it was the first NOFX record to achieve a position on the Billboard charts, reaching number 63. Fat Mike stated: "Weird record. I thought it was the coolest record when we finished it, but a few months later I wasn't so sure. Some of those songs are kinda weird. I like the cover a lot though. I think it sold well in Belgium."

In 1997, the band released So Long and Thanks for All the Shoes, a return to faster punk, as exemplified by the frenetic opening track, "It's My Job to Keep Punk Rock Elite."

NOFX released The Decline, an 18-minute single-track extended play, which served as a fiery and cynical social commentary, in 1999. The Decline, clocking in at 18:23, is the second-longest punk song ever recorded (behind Crass' 20-minute song "Taking Sides").

Move from Epitaph to Fat Wreck Chords (2000–2008)
NOFX released its eighth studio album, Pump Up the Valuum, in 2000. It was the band's final album released through Epitaph, as the band decided to sign to Fat Mike's own label, Fat Wreck Chords.

In 2002, the band recorded BYO Split Series Volume III, a split album with Rancid, in which Rancid covered NOFX songs and NOFX covered Rancid songs.

NOFX released its ninth studio album, The War on Errorism, in 2003, an album of political songs. It became the start of its anti-George W. Bush campaign. Fat Mike organized the website punkvoter.com, compiled two chart-topping Rock Against Bush albums, and started a Rock Against Bush U.S. tour. The song "Separation of Church and Skate" from the album was featured in the game Tony Hawk's Underground. In 2004, a previously unreleased demo version of their song "Concerns of a GOP Neo-Phyte" was contributed to the compilation album Take Action! Vol. 4.

In February 2005, the band launched the NOFX 7" of the Month Club, a subscription-based service, which saw the release of one new extended play almost monthly, from February 2005 to March 2006 (a total of 12 releases). The cover art for these extended plays was chosen from fan-submitted entries. The first 3,000 subscribers to the club received all of their records on colored vinyl. Fat Wreck Chords later released full sets of the extended plays.

On March 14, 2006, the extended play Never Trust a Hippy was released. The EP was followed on April 18 by the studio album Wolves in Wolves' Clothing. On September 12, 2006, the video game EA Sports NHL 07 was released, featuring "Wolves in Wolves' Clothing" on its soundtrack, produced by Bill Stevenson and Fat Mike. NOFX's song "Kill All the White Man" was played briefly in the action movie Crank in 2006, and was credited as such in the film's soundtrack.

In January 2007, the band recorded three nights of performances in San Francisco, California, for their second live album, They've Actually Gotten Worse Live!, released November 20, 2007. The live album is described on the press release as "their sloppiest, drunkest, funniest, best sounding recording ever ... and they even made sure not to play any songs off their 1995 live album I Heard They Suck Live."

NOFX launched a world tour in September 2007, which included concerts in Israel (Jerusalem, Tel Aviv, and Haifa). During its final performances in Israel (September 7 in Haifa), vocalist Fat Mike inadvertently struck guitarist Eric Melvin with his bass guitar during the performance of "Bottles to the Ground", breaking the guitar's neck, and leaving a bloody gash on Melvin's forehead. The broken bass guitar was replaced with one from Useless ID for the rest of the concert. The band completed its scheduled set amidst the audience's cheers for Melvin's good humor and perseverance. This tour was the basis of the band's television show, NOFX: Backstage Passport. The show was originally to be titled NOFX: Punk Rock Passport, but the band had issues with the company that held the rights to air the show, Fuse TV. Along with the show's title being changed, the band had numerous other issues with Fuse, including the company attempting to fabricate storylines that were untrue. Fat Mike, in an interview with Studio Q on the CBC, stated that the three months of editing the show were the worst three months of his life.

During the same tour, NOFX played four concerts in South Africa, the band's first performances on the African continent. The tour of South Africa followed successful tours by the bands Lagwagon, Frenzal Rhomb, and Mad Caddies, all of which are signed to Fat Wreck Chords.

Coaster, Cokie the Clown and Self-Entitled (2009–2014)

In February 2009, NOFX reunited with former members Steve Kidwiler and Dave Casillas for its 25th-anniversary special performances. They played three sold out shows, one in San Diego, one in Hollywood, and one in S.F. NOFX released a new album, Coaster, on April 28, 2009. The band worked with the same co-producer, Bill Stevenson, who produced its previous album, Wolves in Wolves' Clothing. NOFX was also added to the lineup for the Warped Tour 2009. They also toured Australia and New Zealand in late 2009 with Bad Religion.

NOFX released a new extended play on November 24, 2009, titled Cokie the Clown. It was released on one CD or two seven-inch vinyl records, which are called Cokie the Clown and My Orphan Year. The extended play consists of outtakes from the Coaster sessions. NOFX started its spring 2010 "Fermented and Flailing" tour on April 21. This was the official tour for its album Coaster.

During this time period, Fat Mike would occasionally adopt the Cokie the Clown persona (as seen on the extended play's cover and the "Cokie the Clown" music video) during live performances. Fat Mike performed a solo acoustic performance on March 20, 2010, at the SXSW Festival as Cokie, which was described as "strange, emotional, and intimate." At the end of the concert, after debuting a new song called "Drinking Pee", a video that was played for the audience suggested that a number of festival participants unknowingly drank Fat Mike's urine. The stunt resulted in Fat Mike getting banned from the Austin, Texas, venue, Emo's. In May 2010, NOFX posted a video online that showed Fat Mike urinating into a bottle of Patrón as was previously announced, but then switching the bottle before going on stage to a bottle not containing any urine. Months later in an interview, Mike stated that he had "always wanted to be banned from somewhere."

On June 21, 2010, NOFX announced that they were going to release a compilation album titled The Longest EP, a compilation of selected songs from its extended plays from 1987 to 2009. It was released on August 17, 2010.

On November 23, 2010, Fat Wreck Chords released NOFX / The Spits, a split EP with the Seattle, Washington, band The Spits. It contained two new songs from each band.

In a January 2011 interview with The Daily Times, Fat Mike revealed that a new NOFX album was in production, saying "There are some really good songs on Coaster, but after having written 300 songs, I feel lucky I came up with them. That's why there are songs on there about Iron Maiden and Tegan and Sara. I'm reaching, man. Sometimes I grab stuff just to grab stuff, and I'm going in a lot of different directions." In December 2011, Fat Mike revealed to Phoenix New Times that he has begun work on a new NOFX album and a soundtrack to a "fetish film" called Rubber Bordello.

In June 2011, NOFX began their Great White North Tour, which would have them traveling across Canada. The tour kicked off in St. John's, Newfoundland, on June 14. It was the first time the band had been to Newfoundland.

Along with a self-titled 10" of 1980s hardcore punk cover songs, the band also planned to re-release their first recordings in the summer of 2011. The 10" features covers from the Necros and D.O.A. and songs such as "Police Brutality" and "Race Riot." The album was released on a vinyl record and has been distributed to independent record companies around the U.S., Great Britain, and elsewhere.

On February 14, 2012, in an article on Rolling Stone's website, Fat Mike said that a new album was on the way. "We're recording in April, and it should be out in the fall. I've got 12 songs, but I don't have a name for it, and only a few of the songs are finished," he says. "We're demo-ing it right now."

A 7" single, My Stepdad's a Cop and My Stepmom's a Domme, featuring new songs recorded prior to the sessions for Self Entitled, was released in June 2012.
 
NOFX released their twelfth studio album, Self Entitled, on September 11, 2012. NOFX also released X'mas Has Been X'd on January 15, 2013, and their 30th anniversary LP box set on February 19, 2013.

NOFX toured in Australia starting November 5, 2014. They performed in Sydney, Newcastle, New South Wales, Wollongong, Brisbane, Darwin, Northern Territory, Adelaide, Perth, Melbourne, Geelong, and Gold Coast, Queensland.

First Ditch Effort, Single Album, and Double Album (2015–present)
NOFX toured the United States in the summer of 2015 celebrating the 25th anniversary of Fat Wreck Chords. Supporting acts for this tour were Lagwagon, Me First and the Gimme Gimmes, Strung Out, Propagandhi, Swingin' Utters, Bracket, ToyGuitar, The Flatliners, Masked Intruder and Bad Cop/Bad Cop. Guitarist El Hefe said that NOFX was going to work on new music after the Fat Wreck Chords 25th anniversary tour. On their tour to Europe, NOFX stated their new album would be out in September 2016. On July 19, 2016, the band's thirteenth studio album, First Ditch Effort, was announced, to be released on October 7; the lead single "Six Years on Dope" was released the same day. On April 17, 2016, they released their autobiography, called NOFX: The Hepatitis Bathtub and Other Stories. During the tour, named the Hepatitis Bathtub Tour, they did book signings on some dates. On December 16 a special hard-covered edition with a seven-inch four-song vinyl (titled Hepatitis Bathtub) and a bath towel was also released.

In March 2018, NOFX released a new single "There's No 'Too Soon' if Time Is Relative", in tribute to physicist Stephen Hawking, who had died days earlier. The track had been recorded a month prior to its release. Several days later, they announced the first annual "Camp Punk in Drublic Festival" in Legend Valley in Thornville, Ohio. The three-day event was to feature NOFX alongside Rancid, Pennywise, the Mighty Mighty Bosstones and Me First and the Gimme Gimmes. In a May 2018 interview, Fat Mike hinted that NOFX was working on new material.

In February 2019, Fat Mike announced the NOFX 7" of the Month Club, a new subscription-based service scheduled for the release of 12 new extended plays almost monthly. As with the previous 2005 installment, the cover art for these extended plays was chosen from fan-submitted entries.

On August 16, 2019, NOFX released a new single, "Fish in a Gun Barrel". The song was written in response to mass shootings in America, with proceeds from the single going to anti-gun-violence charity Moms Demand Action.

On March 23, 2020, NOFX released a video for another new song, "PRBOD". A few days later, the band released a video for "another new song that didn't make it on the new album" called "The Oddition".

On January 12, 2021, NOFX announced that they would release their first studio album in nearly five years, Single Album, on February 26.

On September 1, 2022, Fat Mike confirmed in a reply to a comment in an Instagram post that NOFX would be disbanding in 2023, the year of the band's 40th anniversary, and suggested that their final show may take place in their hometown of Los Angeles, California.

On September 27, 2022 NOFX announced their next album, Double Album, would come out on December 2, 2022.  They released the single "Darby Crashing," a reworked version of a song from their 2019-2020 "7 inch of the Month Club," on the same day.

NOFX is also planning on releasing three in-progress albums entitled Half Album, Everybody Else Is Insane, and NOFX: A–Z.

Music style and influences
Critics have labeled NOFX's style as primarily punk rock, melodic hardcore,Peter Jandreus, The Encyclopedia of Swedish Punk 1977–1987, Stockholm: Premium Publishing, 2008, p. 11. skate punk, ska punk, pop-punk. Fat Mike in a 2021 Spin interview as identifying NOFX as a melodic hardcore band, and also rejecting critic's labeling of the band's style as pop-punk. Some of their songs focus on, or reference, topics such as left-wing politics and anarchy, society, racism, xenophobia, sexism, sexuality, misogyny, homophobia and homosexuality, class inequalities, the use of drugs and alcohol, the media and popular culture, religion and schadenfreude, often represented in a humorous manner. The band has released songs that range in length from under a minute, with songs such as "I Gotta Pee" (0:32) and "Murder the Government" (0:45), to its longest song, "The Decline", which is 18 minutes 22 seconds long.

NOFX also frequently poke fun (in a lighthearted manner) at other bands and figures in the punk rock community. Such examples include "Whoa on the Whoas", parodying The Offspring's frequent use of the word "whoa" in their songs, and mocking Blink-182 in their song "Fun Things to Fuck (If You're a Winner)". The band is also known for referencing or paying tribute to Bad Religion in both their songs and their albums, with examples including "I Am a Huge Fan of Bad Religion"; mentioning their records on "We Got Two Jealous Agains" and its sequel "I've Got One Jealous Again, Again"; and the cover of Surfer parodying that of Bad Religion's 1988 album Suffer. A split album between NOFX and fellow punk band Rancid featured each group covering 6 songs from the other band's catalog.

The band cites its influences as Bad Religion, Rich Kids on LSD, D.I., SNFU, Operation Ivy, The Dickies, Descendents, Circle Jerks, Dead Milkmen, Ramones, Sex Pistols, Adrenalin O.D., Minor Threat, Germs, Suicidal Tendencies, Black Flag, Dead Kennedys, The Adolescents, Misfits, and Subhumans.

Relationship with the media
For years the band consented to very few interviews and have only made a few music videos, citing the fact that it does not need any more exposure and that people were exploiting the group. In recent years, Fat Mike has consented to more interviews, including six different interviews with Nardwuar between 2002 and 2011. The band has also refused permission for its music videos to be broadcast on MTV, VH1, and similar music channels, although its music has been played on Canada's Much Music. NOFX made a live appearance on NBC's Late Night with Conan O'Brien in 2004. The band briefly pursued an "anti-Conan" riff, although the intent was likely jocular.

The credits on the album Heavy Petting Zoo call out MTV, along with commercial radio stations and major labels, saying "we've been doin' just fine all these years without you so leave us the fuck alone" and calling them "assholes."

Fat Mike has also repeatedly conducted interviews with the Australian alternative radio station Triple J on its breakfast show with Jay (Jason Whalley) and the Doctor (Lindsay McDougall). Jay and the Doctor are both members of Frenzal Rhomb, an Australian punk rock band that has played many tours and festivals with NOFX, and that has its music distribution outside Australia handled by Mike's Fat Wreck Chords label.

In 2008, NOFX aired a documentary series on Fuse TV about its worldwide tour. The show was entitled NOFX: Backstage Passport.

Controversy
In 2018, the band attracted significant controversy after statements by Fat Mike and rhythm guitarist Eric Melvin during a concert in Las Vegas on May 30, 2018. Referencing the 2017 Las Vegas shooting, Melvin stated "I guess you only get shot in Vegas if you're in a country band," and Mike replied with “You know, that [massacre] sucked, but least they were country fans and not punk rock fans." The lead sponsor of the Punk in Drublic festival, Stone Brewing Co., pulled support from the festival as well as from NOFX's line of craft beer. NOFX and Me First and the Gimme Gimmes were subsequently removed from the festival's lineup.

The band later apologized, stating, "What we said in Vegas was shitty and insensitive and we are all embarrassed by our remarks." In June 2018 the band stated that all of their U.S. concerts had been canceled and they had been "effectively banned" from playing in the United States due to the comments. However, Fat Mike later clarified otherwise, stating that "Our promoter canceled — my partner [not the venues]."

Band membersCurrent members "Fat" Mike Burkett – bass, keyboards, piano, occasional guitar (1983–present); lead vocals (1983–1986, 1986–present)
 Eric Melvin – rhythm guitar (1983–1986, 1986–present); lead guitar (1983–1987) accordion, backing vocals, occasional bass (1983–present)
 Erik "Smelly" Sandin – drums (1983–1985, 1986–present)
 Aaron "El Hefe" Abeyta – lead guitar, trumpet, trombone, backing vocals (1991–present)Touring members Karina Deniké – keyboards, backing vocals (2015–present)Former members Scott Sellers – drums (1985)
 Scott Aldahl – drums (1986)
 Dave Allen – lead vocals (1986; died 1986)
 Dave Casillas – lead guitar (1987–1989)
 Steve Kidwiler – lead guitar (1989–1991)

Timeline

DiscographyStudio albums'''
 Liberal Animation (1988)
 S&M Airlines (1989)
 Ribbed (1991)
 White Trash, Two Heebs and a Bean (1992)
 Punk in Drublic (1994)
 Heavy Petting Zoo (1996)
 So Long and Thanks for All the Shoes (1997)
 Pump Up the Valuum (2000)
 The War on Errorism (2003)
 Wolves in Wolves' Clothing (2006)
 Coaster (2009)
 Self Entitled (2012)
 First Ditch Effort (2016)
 Single Album (2021)
 Double Album'' (2022)

Bibliography

References

External links

 NOFX official website
 Official Facebook page 

 
Musical groups established in 1983
Epitaph Records artists
Fat Wreck Chords artists
Punk rock groups from California
Musical groups from Los Angeles
Musical groups from San Francisco
Musical quartets
Melodic hardcore musical groups from California
1983 establishments in California
Skate punk groups
Political music groups
Obscenity controversies in music
2018 controversies in the United States